Rhizophagus is a genus of arbuscular mycorrhizal (AM) fungi that form symbiotic relationships (mycorrhizas) with plant roots. The genome of Rhizophagus irregularis (formerly Glomus intraradices) was recently sequenced.

References

Glomerales
Fungus genera
Taxa described in 1896